Croc was a French-language humour magazine published monthly in Montreal, Quebec, Canada from 1979 until 1995.

Publication history
Croc ("Fang" in French) was begun in October 1979 by Jacques Hurtubise, Hélène Fleury, and Roch Côté, with the help of an $80,000 grant from the ministère des Affaires culturelles du Québec ("Québec Ministry of Cultural Affairs").  It printed the work of many leading cartoonists of the era, many of whom were able to launch their careers through the magazine's help, including animator Claude Cloutier.

Croc begat another magazine, Titanic, dedicated entirely to comics. Croc's publishers briefly distributed a localised edition of MAD magazine from 1991 to 1992, which adapted and translated existing MAD articles by replacing New York City references with Montreal ones.

For a number of reasons, Croc ceased publication in April 1995 after 189 issues.

See also

Canadian comics
Quebec comics
Safarir

References

Further reading
Mira Falardeau, La bande dessinée au Québec, éditions du Boréal, 1994  
Bernard Dubois, Bande dessinée québécoise : répertoire bibliographique à suivre, éditions D.B.K., 1996 
Michel Viau, BDQ, Répertoire des publications de bandes dessinées au Québec des origines à nos jours, éditions Mille-Îles, 1999 
Mira Falardeau, Histoire de la bande dessinée au Québec, VLB éditeur, 2008 

1979 comics debuts
1979 establishments in Quebec
1995 disestablishments in Quebec
Defunct magazines published in Canada
French-language magazines published in Canada
Humour magazines published in Canada
Magazines about comics
Magazines established in 1979
Magazines disestablished in 1995
Magazines published in Montreal
Monthly magazines published in Canada
Parodies
Quebec comics
Satirical magazines published in Canada
Satirical comics